Catheline Ndamira is a Ugandan businesswoman and politician who has also been the Kabale District woman representative a position she has held since 2016.

Background and education 
She was born on 13 August 1977.  Catheline Ndamira attended Rubirizi S.S.S. for her high school education. She studied Business at Makerere University Business School, graduating with the certificate in business administration in 2008, She went on to obtain a diploma from Makerere University Business School, in Kampala in 2010. In 2014, she obtained a Bachelor of Business Administration and Management from the Uganda Martyrs University.

Work experience 

Between 2010 and 2015 she worked as a financial Administrator at VIDAS ENGINEERING SERVICES CO. LTD

Following the February 2016 general election, Catheline Ndamira Atwakiire was unanimously elected as Kabale District woman representative on 2016.

Parliamentary duties 
Besides her duties as a member of the Ugandan Parliament, she sits on the following parliamentary committees:

 Public Accounts Committee member 
 committee on health- Member<ref>Patliament of Uganda retrieved 15 April 2020

References

Living people
Members of the Parliament of Uganda
Women members of the Parliament of Uganda
1977 births